Piet Hein or Piet-Hein may refer to:

People
 Piet Pieterszoon Hein (1577–1629), Dutch naval commander and folk hero
 Piet Hein (scientist) (1905–1996), descendant of the above, Danish poet and scientist
 Piet Hein Donner (born 1948), Dutch politician nicknamed "Piet Hein"
 Piet-Hein Geeris (born 1972), Dutch field hockey player

Ships
 Dutch ship Piet Hein (1810), an 80-gun ship of the line of the navy of the Batavian Republic, never launched
 French ship Piet Hein (1813), a 74-gun ship of the line of the French Navy
 HNLMS Piet Hein (1894), a coastal defence ship of the Royal Netherlands Navy
 HNLMS Piet Hein (1929), a destroyer of the Royal Netherlands Navy
 HNLMS Piet Hein (F811), a frigate of the Royal Netherlands Navy
 Piet Hein (royal yacht) (1937), a wedding gift to Princess Juliana of the Netherlands